Honducor is the mail service of Honduras.

History 
Honducor was created as part of legislation 120–93 in September 1993, and was implemented according to regulation 004521-A. Honducor began its operations in Honduras in September 1993.

Honducor internal policies are subject by these policies established by the Universal Postal Union (UPU), The Americas Spain and Portugal Postal Union, and the Central American Postal Union Association (Including Dominican Republic). Under the secretary of labor, transportation and housing (SOPTRAVI for Spanish acronym) in Honduras.

Honducor is a decentralized mail service with over 205 offices, is run within the public and private sector, and is funded by its own services and by the state.

Mission
 Provide non-exclusive postal service to Honduras.
 Obtain related commercial contracts aligned with social objectives, while keeping service in the country.
 Perform all operations that are complementary and permitted by law. Honducor is obligated to provide service in compliance with international agreements. 
 Compete with better technology, offer new products and services, and improve systems.
 Refine the mission and vision to accommodate changes needed to embark in new venues, lift the quality of service and satisfy the social roles that the state has assigned.

Honduras Zip Codes
Departments / City / Location

Atlantida
  La Ceiba 31101
 Tela 31301

Colon
 Trujillo 32101
 Tocoa 32301

Comayagua
 Comayagua 12101
 Siguatepeque 12111

Copan
 Santa Rosa de Copán 41101
 La Entrada 41202
 La Ruidosa 41203

Cortes
 San Pedro Sula
 Sector N.E. 21101
 Sector N.W. 21102
 Sector S.E. 21103
 Sector S.W. 21104

Puerto Cortes
 Puerto Cortes 21301

Choluteca
 Choluteca 51101
 Pespire 51201

El Paraiso
 Yuscaran 13101
 Danli 13201

Francisco Morazan
 Tegucigalpa 11101
 Comayaguela 12101

Gracias A Dios
 Puerto Lempira 33101

Intibucá
 Intibucá 14000
 La Esperanza 14101
 Jesús de Otoro 14201
 All other municipalities 14000

Islas de La Bahia (Bay Islands)
 Roatan 34101

La Paz
 La Paz 15101
 Marcala 15201

Lempira
 Gracias 42101
 Erandique 42201

Ocotepeque
 Ocotepeque 43101
 San Marcos de Ocotepeque 43201

Olancho
 Juticalpa 16101
 Catacamas 16201

Santa Barbara
 Santa Barbara 22101
 Trinidad 22114

Valle
 Nacaome 52101
 San Lorenzo 52102

Yoro
 Yoro 23101
 El Progresso 23201

References

External links 
 
 

Communications in Honduras
Postal services
1993 establishments in Honduras